Maras, subfamily Dolichotinae, are a group of rodents in the family Caviidae. These large relatives of guinea pigs are common in the Patagonian steppes of Argentina, but also live in Paraguay and elsewhere in South America. There are two extant species, the Patagonian mara of the genus Dolichotis and the Chacoan mara of the genus Pediolagus; traditionally this species was also thought to belong to Dolichotis however a 2020 study by the American Society of Mammalogists found significant difference between the two mara species to warrant resurrecting the genus Pediolagus for it. Several extinct genera are also known.

Description 

Maras have stocky bodies, three sharp-clawed digits on the hind feet, and four digits of the fore feet. Maras have been described as resembling long-legged rabbits.

Most maras have brown heads and bodies, dark (almost black) rumps with a white fringe around the base, and white bellies.

Maras may amble, hop in a rabbit-like fashion, gallop, or bounce on all fours.

Maras mate for life, and may have from one to three offspring each year. Mara young are very well-developed, and can start grazing within 24 hours. They use a crèche system, where one pair of adults keeps watch all the young in the crèche. If they spot danger, the young rush below ground into a burrow, and the adults are left to run to escape.

Genera 
Dolichotis
Pediolagus
†Eodolichotis
†Pliodolichotis
†Propediolagus
†Rhodanodolichotis

Interaction with humans 
Patagonian maras are often kept in zoos or as pets, and are also known as "Patagonian cavies" or "Patagonian hares". They can be quite social with humans if raised with human interaction from a young age, though they avoid people in the wild. Maras may even change their habits from coming out in day to becoming nocturnal, simply to avoid social interaction. In 2021 they had young in Leningrad Zoo of Saint Petersburg, Russia.

Gallery

References

External links 

 Patagonian Mara - National Zoo| FONZ (via archive.org)

Cavies
Extant Miocene first appearances
Articles containing video clips